St Dunstan's, Mayfield in Mayfield, East Sussex was founded in 960 CE by St Dunstan, who was then Archbishop of Canterbury. It is reported as being originally a log church which lasted until it was replaced by a stone structure in the 12th century by the Normans. In 1389 this church was virtually destroyed by fire. Only the tower, the lancet window in the west wall and the base of the north aisle survive to this day. The local congregation probably used the private chapel at the Archiepiscopal Palace nearby until the church was rebuilt between 1410 and 1420.

Further work was carried out during the reign of Henry VIII: the nave roof was raised and the clerestory was added. In 1657 a clock was installed by Thomas Punnett.

In the South Porch moulded corbels support a quadripartite rib vault. A newel staircase gives access to the Parvise Room above. This was used as either an oratory for a chantry priest, or as a sacristan. During the 19th century it was used as a cloakroom for the girls' school held in the church.

The nave has four tomb slabs of Sussex iron. The best preserved belongs to Thomas Sands, a wine cooper of London. The font dates from 1666 and the initials of the vicar at the time, Robert Peck is carved on the octagonal bowl. The 17th century pulpit is decorated with Jacobean strap-carvings.

While many of the choir stalls dated back to the 16th century, some repair work was carried out by the Mayfield School of Carving in the early 20th century. They also provided the Lady Chapel screen, which is an excellent example of linenfold carving. The choir stall were replaced in 2016 by new movable stalls in oak and at the same time the east end was reordered.

The perpendicular east window has Munich glass donated by the Treherne family in 1869. In 1894 the old reredos carved by Walter Gale, the village schoolmaster in 1750 was replaced.  The Pope was said to enjoy this eastern facing window as it represented to him, a gateway between eastern and western culture. (reference required)

A window at the west end of the church celebrates the life of Lt Gen Sir John Bagot Glubb, known as Glubb Pasha, soldier, scholar and author, who led and trained Transjordan's Arab Legion between 1939 and 1956.

During the 1970s cracks in the tower walls meant that it was forbidden to ring all the bells at once. It was fourteen years before the tower could be restored at a cost of £140,000. The bells were retuned at the Whitechapel Bell Foundry. The oldest bell had been founded by Thomas Giles in 1602 and other founders included Brian Eldredge, Richard Phelps, John Waylett and John Taylor.

Many of the memorials in the church belong to the Baker and Kirby families. These were local ironmaster families.
Georgina Weldon is interred in the Dalrymple family vault.

See also

List of current places of worship in Wealden

Religious buildings and structures completed in 960
Wealden District
Grade I listed churches in East Sussex
12th-century church buildings in England
Church of England church buildings in East Sussex
Dunstan